Ottobrunn is a station of the Munich S-Bahn. It is located in the south-eastern suburb of Ottobrunn. It is served by the line S7 in the direction of Kreuzstraße and Wolfratshausen in 20 minute intervals. The station consists of a station building and a platform, which services both in- and outbound trains. The station building hosts a bank and an art gallery. The station is not staffed, so tickets can only be bought at machines.

References

Munich S-Bahn stations